The Kurtöp language (Dzongkha: ཀུར་ཏོ་པ་ཁ་; Wylie: Kur-to-pa kha; Kurtöpkha, also called Kurtö and Zhâke) is an East Bodish language spoken in Kurtoe Gewog, Lhuntse District, Bhutan. In 1993, there were about 10,000 speakers of Kurtöp.

Related languages
Historically, Kurtöp and its speakers have had close contact with speakers of Bumthang, Nupbi and Kheng languages, nearby languages of central and eastern Bhutan to the extent that they may be considered part of a wider collection of "Bumthang languages".

See also
Languages of Bhutan

References

Further reading

External links 

Languages of Bhutan
East Bodish languages
Languages written in Tibetan script